The Second Woman may refer to:

 The Second Woman (1950 film), a film by James V. Kern starring Robert Young and Betsy Drake 
 The Second Woman (1953 film), a film by José Díaz Morales starring Rosa Carmina and Antonio Aguilar
 The Second Woman (2012 film), a film by Carol Lai starring Shu Qi and Shawn Yue